Amir Mohamed el Khalifa (born February 24, 1985), better known by his stage name Oddisee, is an American rapper and record producer from Washington, D.C. He is one third of rap trio Diamond District. He was also part of the Low Budget Crew. He is based in Brooklyn, New York.

Early life 
Oddisee was born to an African American mother and a Sudanese father, at Howard University Hospital in Washington, D.C. He was raised by his stepmother (who was also Sudanese) and father. He grew up in Silver Spring, Maryland, as well as Prince George's County, Maryland. He moved to Washington, D.C. after high school.

Career 
In 2010, Oddisee released Traveling Man on Mello Music Group. His Odd Spring mixtape was listed on the Washington Post'''s Best Local Hip-Hop mixtapes of 2010. In 2011, Oddisee released Rock Creek Park, which was ranked as a Mixtape of the Week by Stereogum. Odd Seasons, a collection of EPs released throughout the previous 12 months, was also released that year.

In 2012, he released a studio album, People Hear What They See. The Beauty in All, his first instrumental release since Rock Creek Park, was released in 2013. In that year, he also released Tangible Dream. In 2015, he released The Good Fight. In 2016, he released an EP, Alwasta, and a mixtape, The Odd Tape. In 2017, he released a studio album, The Iceberg, as well as a live album, Beneath the Surface.

 Style and influences 
Oddisee was originally influenced by his parents' heritages, combined with a hip hop influence from his older cousins. In an interview with NPR, he explained why he was influenced by early East Coast emcees such as Eric B. & Rakim, De La Soul, and A Tribe Called Quest. He stated that these rappers don't talk about drugs or murder, and he could relate more to their lyrics.

 Discography 

 Studio albums 
 101 (2008)
 Mental Liberation (2009)
 New Money (2009) 
 In the Ruff (2009) 
 Traveling Man (2010)
 People Hear What They See (2012)
 The Beauty in All (2013)
 Tangible Dream (2013)
 March on Washington (2014) 
 The Good Fight (2015)
 The Iceberg (2017)
 To What End (2023)

 Live albums 
 Beneath the Surface (2017)

 Compilation albums 
 Odd Seasons (2011)

 Mixtapes 
 Instrumental Mixtape Volume One (2005) 
 The Remixture Vol. 1 (2006)
 Foot in the Door (2006)
 Instrumental Mixtape Vol. 2 (2006)
 Odd Summer (2009)
 Odd Autumn (2009)
 Odd Winter (2010)
 Odd Spring (2010)
 Rock Creek Park (2011)
 The Odd Tape (2016)

 EPs 
 Good Tree (2008)
 Hear My Dear (2008)
 Odd Renditions Vol. 001 (2012)
 Alwasta (2016)
 Odd Cure (2020)

 Singles 
 "Show You" / "Part of the World" (2006) 
 "Once Again" (2006)
 "101" (2008)
 "Slow It Down" (2012)
 "Ain't That Peculiar (Remix)" (2013)
 "Lost Cause" (2014) 
 "That's Love" (2015)

As a member of Ave.to
 Three Way Intersection (2008)

 Guest appearances 
 DJ Jazzy Jeff - "Musik Lounge" from The Magnificent (2002)
 The Foreign Exchange - "The Answer" from Connected (2004)
 Kenn Starr - "Nothing But Time" from Starr Status (2006)
 SoulStice - "Get It Right" from Dead Letter Perfect (2007)
 Marco Polo - "Low Budget Allstars" from Port Authority (2007)
 J-Live - "The Upgrade" from Then What Happened? (2008)
 SoulStice & Sbe - "Unfold" from Beyond Borders (2009)
 Apollo Brown - "Lower the Boom" and "Propa" from The Reset (2010)
 JR & PH7 - "Hustle and Flow" from The Update (2010)
 B-Doub - "All in a Days Work" from Food for Thought (2010)
 Apollo Brown - "The Times" from Clouds (2011)
 DTMD - "Been Tryin'" from Makin' Dollas (2011)
 Trek Life - "Might Sound Crazy" from Wouldn't Change Nothing (2011)
 Eric Lau - "What I'd Rather" (2012)
 Trek Life - "We Good" from Hometown Foreigner (2013)
 Eric Lau - "Rise Up" from One of Many (2013)
 20syl - "Ongoing Thing" from Motifs (2014)
 Soulpete - "Rhymes on Random" from Soul Raw (2014)
 Apollo Brown - "What You Were Lookin' For" from Grandeur (2015)
 No Wyld - "Nomads" from Nomads (2016)
 L'Orange - "Look Around" from The Ordinary Man (2017)
 Ramey Dawoud - "The Strife" (2020)
 Elaquent - "Guidelines" from Forever Is a Pretty Long Time (2020)

 Productions 
 J-Live - "Aaw Yeah" from The Hear After (2005)
 Sareem Poems - "Tell It" and "She So" from Black and Read All Over (2009)
 Verbal Kent - "In the Beginning" from Save Your Friends (2010)
 Trek Life - "Ready to Live", "Still Never Rains", "As the World Turns", "Everything Changed Nothing", “Wow", "Due West", "So Supreme", "I'd Rather Be", "So LA", "Jump Out There", and "Might Sound Crazy" from Everything Changed Nothing (2010)
 Georgia Anne Muldrow & Declaime - "Get Up Gogo" from Heaven or Hell (2010)
 Trek Life - "Get in Touch" and "Wouldn't Change Nothing" from Wouldn't Change Nothing (2011)
 Has-Lo - "Last Day of School" from Conversation B (2011)
 Homeboy Sandman - "Whatchu Want from Me?" from First of a Living Breed (2012)
 Substantial - "Check My Resume", "Make Believe", "Shit on My Lawn", "Umoja", and "Movin Alright" from Home Is Where the Art Is (2012)
 Rainy Milo - "The Other Way" from Limey (2012)
 Joey Badass - "Sorry Bonita" from Summer Knights (2013)
 Far Exp - "Checklist" from The Expansion (2014)
 Ardamus - "If Only I Gave Ah" from I Can'Replace Me, Pt. 1: Improve (2014)
 King Mez - "New Vinyl" (2014)
 Finale - Odds & Ends (2015)
 Ardamus - "When The Truth Comes Out, Pt. 2" and "Luxury Tax" I Can'Replace Me, Pt. 2: Develop'' (2014)

References

External links 
 
 
 

African-American male rappers
African-American Muslims
1985 births
American people of Sudanese descent
Living people
Mello Music Group artists
Rappers from Maryland
Rappers from Washington, D.C.
People from Largo, Maryland
21st-century American rappers
21st-century American male musicians
21st-century African-American musicians
20th-century African-American people